Bowry is an English surname. Notable people with the surname include:

 Bobby Bowry (born 1971), English-born Kittian football player
 Daniel Bowry (born 1998), English football player
 Jody Bowry (born 1980), English football player

See also
 Howry

English-language surnames